The 2018 Libertarian National Convention was held from June 30 to July 3, 2018, in New Orleans, Louisiana. According to the Libertarian Party, the 2018 convention was the "biggest Libertarian
National Convention ever," breaking previous records in attendance and fundraising.

Theme
The theme was "I'm THAT Libertarian!", a phrase uttered by the late Marc Allan Feldman in a Libertarian presidential debate at the 2016 national convention.

Events

Chair election
Nicholas Sarwark's seat as Chair of the Libertarian National Committee (LNC) was up for election. Sarwark faced challenge from Washington LP member Joshua Smith, Libertarian Socialist Caucus member Matt Kuehnel, former Gary Johnson and John McAfee campaign staffer Christopher Thrasher and Libertarian Party of Carbon County Chair Matt Schutter. Sarwark ended up winning an unprecedented consecutive third-term as LNC chair.

Endorsements

Polling

Results

Vice chair election
The seat of Vice chair was also up for election, the incumbent being Arvin Vohra. Alex Merced, 2017 candidate for New York comptroller, Libertarian Youth Caucus founder Trent Somes III, 2018 Iowa gubernatorial candidate Jake Porter, Indiana activist Joe Hauptmann, Treasurer of the Libertarian Radical Caucus Steve Scheetz, former Indiana Libertarian Party chair Sam Goldstein and Montana Libertarian Joe Paschal all sought election to the position.

In January 2018 Arvin Vohra drew criticism for condoning sexual relations between adults and minors so long as affirmative consent is given, using the example of a 25-year-old male and a 15-year-old female. Multiple state Libertarian parties demanded Vohra be relieved from his position, as well as the Libertarian Youth Caucus through Trent Somes III, one of Vohra's opponents in the vice chairmanship election.

Endorsements

Debates

Polling

Speakers
Notable speakers included:
 Jim Cantrell, entrepreneur
 Judge James P. Gray, 2012 Libertarian vice presidential nominee
 Carla Howell, former Executive Director of the Libertarian National Committee
 Zoltan Istvan, 2018 candidate for Governor of California and 2020 candidate for President of the United States
 Tim Moen, leader of the Libertarian Party of Canada (2014–)
 Brandon Phinney, Libertarian member of the New Hampshire House of Representatives (2016–2018)
 Larry Sharpe, 2016 vice presidential candidate and 2018 candidate for Governor of New York
 Joel Trammell, entrepreneur

Controversies

Feud with Libertarian Party Mises Caucus
In late 2017, the Libertarian Party Mises Caucus reached out to the chairman of the 2018 LP Convention Committee, Daniel Hayes, entertaining the thought of former congressman and 1988 Libertarian Party presidential nominee Ron Paul and Freedom Watch host Judge Napolitano speaking at the convention, offering to pay off speaking fees. Hayes rejected the idea of Paul speaking at the convention, saying "he has no idea what the LP represents", criticizing Napolitano as well. Ron Paul confronted the controversy, stating he has been a lifetime member of the Libertarian Party since 1987 when he paid using a gold coin, and asked, "do I get my gold coin back?"

On February 3, 2018 Nicholas Sarwark confronted the controversy, saying in a tweet: "If Ron Paul decides he wants to attend the Libertarian Party national convention in New Orleans and speak, I'll make sure he gets time on the stage. It's the least we can do for a life member, former Presidential nominee, and Hall of Liberty award winner."

See also
 United States elections, 2018

References

External links
 Convention Website

2018 conferences
2018 in Louisiana
2018
June 2018 events in the United States
July 2018 events in the United States